Neil John Taylor (born 7 February 1989) is a Welsh former professional footballer who played as a left-back.

A former Manchester City trainee, he began his career with Wrexham in 2007 and moved to Swansea City for an initial £150,000 in 2010, going on to make 179 appearances for the Swans. He joined Aston Villa in January 2017 as part of a swap for Jordan Ayew, and made 103 total appearances. After being released, he signed for Middlesbrough in November 2021, where he played for the final season of his career.

Taylor made his full international debut for Wales in 2010, and earned 43 caps up to 2019. He was part of their squad which reached the semi-finals at UEFA Euro 2016, and also represented Great Britain at the 2012 Olympics on home soil. Born to a Bengali mother from India, he was one of a relatively small number of British Asians in professional football.

Club career

Wrexham
Taylor began his career at Manchester City, but left the club at the age of 15. He instead moved to Wrexham at the age of 16, progressing through the youth system at the club, signing a professional contract in July 2007. He made his professional debut on 28 August 2007 in the second round of the League Cup, as a 79th-minute substitute for Eifion Williams in a 0–5 home loss to Aston Villa at the Racecourse Ground. On 22 September, he made his league debut, starting in a 2–1 League Two loss at Stockport County, crossing for the opening goal by Marc Williams. He finished the 2007–08 season when he made 27 league and cup appearances. He signed an extension to his contract on 13 March 2008, keeping him at Wrexham until 2010. Wrexham finished the season with relegation out of The Football League.

On 7 October 2008, Taylor scored his first career goal, in a 3–1 home win over York City in the Conference Premier, a match in which he was captain, and followed it up with another in a 5–0 rout of Eastbourne Borough on 20 December. His only other Wrexham goal came in his last appearance on 10 April 2010, volleying to conclude a 2–0 win at relegated Grays Athletic.

Swansea City

At the end of the 2009–10 season, Taylor joined Football League Championship side Swansea City on a free transfer. A fee of £150,000 plus 10% of any future profit was agreed between the two clubs just before entering a professional footballers compensation committee tribunal on 30 September 2010. He made his Swans debut on 21 August, as a half-time substitute for Albert Serrán in a 2–0 defeat at Norwich City. He had played 15 league matches, due to injuries and suspensions, before spraining his ankle against Reading on 1 January 2011. He made his return on 19 February against Doncaster Rovers, the same week where both he and captain Garry Monk became fathers. On 12 May, in the Championship play-off semi-final first leg against Nottingham Forest, Taylor was sent off after 53 seconds for a high challenge on Lewis McGugan, with the match ending in a goalless draw.

His impressive form then sparked a £1 million plus bid from Newcastle United that summer, but he committed himself to the Swans instead with a contract extension. That paid off for both player and club as Taylor again enjoyed a successful season in helping the Swans to 11th spot in their first Premier League campaign.

Taylor suffered a broken ankle in the match against Sunderland on 1 September 2012 after falling awkwardly during a challenge on Craig Gardner in the early stages of the match and was ruled out until the end of the season. On 14 December 2012, Taylor signed a new three-and-a-half-year contract with Swansea, lasting until 2016.

In late February, Taylor returned to full training after six months out with injury. Shortly before his return, Swansea City won the League Cup Final following a 5–0 win over League Two side Bradford City. In late April, he played 80 minutes for Swansea City U21s as part of his rehabilitation. Taylor made his first senior appearance since his injury as a substitute for Ben Davies in a 2–0 loss against Chelsea on 28 April 2013. After the match, he expressed relief at his return to the first team.

After Taylor's return, Swansea manager Michael Laudrup described the battle for the left-back slot between Taylor and Davies as "a beautiful problem for a manager to have". Following the transfer of Davies to Tottenham Hotspur in 2014, Taylor reestablished himself as first-choice left back for Swansea. Taylor signed a new four-year contract in June 2015, tying him to the club until 2019.

Aston Villa
After his position as Swansea's left back was challenged by Stephen Kingsley and Martin Olsson, on 31 January 2017 Taylor joined Championship side Aston Villa along with an estimated £5 million in exchange for Jordan Ayew. He made his debut eleven days later in a 1–0 home loss to Ipswich Town, starting and playing 77 minutes while wearing a protective mask over his fractured cheekbone. Manager Steve Bruce said he did well given his injury and lack of match practice.

On 30 September 2017, Taylor was sent off at the end of a 1–0 home win over Bolton Wanderers for a foul on Adam Le Fondre. He was not included in the Villa team that lost the 2018 EFL Championship play-off Final, but played as they won against Derby County in the next year's edition.

Injury limited Taylor to 14 Premier League games in 2019–20, as Villa avoided the drop on the final day. The following season, he made just one 15-minute league appearance as a substitute for the injured Matt Targett in a 2–0 loss at Manchester City, and was released at the end of his contract.

Middlesbrough
On 18 November 2021, Taylor joined Championship side Middlesbrough on a short-term contract until the middle of January. He made his debut a month later, with Chris Wilder picking him instead of Marc Bola for a 1–0 home win over AFC Bournemouth, after which the manager praised him. On 14 January, having made one more appearance and with Bola suffering a knee injury, Taylor's deal was extended for the rest of the season. Taylor was released by the club at the end of the season.

On 7 November 2022, Taylor announced his retirement as a player at the age of 33, through a statement on Twitter.

International career

Wales
Taylor was also eligible for India through his mother. He made his debut for Wales on 23 May 2010 in a friendly against Croatia at the Stadion Gradski vrt, replacing Andy Dorman for the final 23 minutes of the 2–0 loss; he and Mark Bradley had been promoted from the under-21 team in an emergency. In May 2011, he played two matches at the Nations Cup in Dublin.

On 9 September 2014, in Wales' first match of UEFA Euro 2016 qualification, he gave away a penalty to Andorra in the fifth minute, converted by Ildefons Lima, but the Welsh fought back for a 2–1 victory. At the final tournament in France, he played every minute as Wales reached a tournament semi-final for the first time. He scored his first international goal in a 3–0 group win over Russia; it was his first senior goal since one for Wrexham at Grays Athletic in April 2010.

Taylor was sent off on 24 March 2017 in a goalless World Cup qualifier away to the Republic of Ireland, for a foul that resulted in Séamus Coleman breaking his leg. Coleman needed surgery on a broken tibia and fibula after being injured in the match and Taylor was given a two-match international ban by FIFA.

He withdrew from the Welsh squad in November 2019 due to personal reasons.

Great Britain
Stuart Pearce named Taylor in his 18-man squad for the 2012 Summer Olympics in London as one of three Swansea City players. He played his first match for Great Britain in a friendly against Brazil at the Riverside Stadium on 20 July. He then went on to appear in all of the team's group stage fixtures, helping to secure progression into the knockout stages.

Personal life
Taylor was born in St Asaph, Denbighshire, and brought up in nearby Ruthin, where he attended Ysgol Brynhyfryd. He is of mixed Welsh-Indian descent; his mother, Shibani Chakraborty, is a Bengali from Kolkata in India, while his father, John Taylor, is Welsh. While playing for Swansea he lived with his wife Genna and their two children in Killay, Swansea. In a 2016 spring clean, they donated furniture worth thousands of pounds to be sold by the British Heart Foundation. Taylor travels to India to promote football, and has said that due to his name, the population are surprised to learn of his ancestry. Taylor became president of Ruthin Town F.C. in 2016.

Career statistics

Club

International

International goals
As of match played 20 June 2016. Wales score listed first, score column indicates score after each Taylor goal.

Honours
Aston Villa
EFL Championship play-offs: 2019
EFL Cup runner-up: 2019–20

References

External links

Neil Taylor profile at Aston Villa F.C.

1989 births
Living people
Sportspeople from St Asaph
People from Ruthin
Sportspeople from Denbighshire
Welsh people of Indian descent
British Asian footballers
British sportspeople of Indian descent
British people of Bengali descent
British people of Anglo-Indian descent
Welsh footballers
Wales youth international footballers
Wales under-21 international footballers
Wales semi-pro international footballers
Wales international footballers
Association football defenders
Wrexham A.F.C. players
Swansea City A.F.C. players
Aston Villa F.C. players
Middlesbrough F.C. players
English Football League players
National League (English football) players
Premier League players
Olympic footballers of Great Britain
Footballers at the 2012 Summer Olympics
UEFA Euro 2016 players